Michael Simpson or Mike Simpson may refer to:

Entertainment
 Michael Simpson (painter) (born 1940), English painter
 Michael Simpson (producer), American record producer and member of the electronic group Dust Brothers
 Mike Simpson (Caulfields), guitarist of the rock group The Caulfields
 Mike Simpson (writer), British writer and educator
 Mickey Simpson (1913–1985), American actor
 M. J. Simpson, British movie journalist, author and screenwriter
 Michael A. Simpson, director of sequels to the cult horror film Sleepaway Camp

Politics
 Mike Simpson (Michigan politician) (1962–2009), member of the Michigan House of Representatives
 Mike Simpson (born 1950), U.S. congressman from Idaho

Sports
 Mike Simpson (American football) (born 1947), American football player
 Michael Simpson (footballer) (born 1974), British footballer

See also
 Michael Simpson Culbertson (1819–1862), American clergyman and missionary